Orconectes sheltae, the Shelta Cave crayfish, is a small, freshwater crayfish endemic to Alabama in the United States. It is a cave-dwelling species known from only one cave, Shelta Cave in Madison County, Alabama. This cave is also home to ''O. australis and Cambarus jonesi.

It was first discovered in 1963, before being formally described in 1997. The last cave survey to successfully locate the species was in 1988, and therefore it was considered as being extinct for over 30 years until its rediscovery in 2019.

References

Cambaridae
Cave crayfish
Freshwater crustaceans of North America
Crustaceans described in 1997
Endemic fauna of Alabama